Jordan Pereira (born 6 April 1993) is a New Zealand professional rugby league footballer who plays as a er for the Brisbane Broncos in the NRL.

He previously played for the St. George Illawarra Dragons in the National Rugby League.

Early life
Pereira was born in Lower Hutt, New Zealand to a Samoan father and English mother. 

He played his junior rugby league for the Willagee Bears in Perth Rugby League.

Early career
In 2014, Pereira went on to play in the QLD Intrust Super Cup for the Mackay Cutters. Midway through 2017, Pereira signed with the St. George Illawarra Dragons on an 18-month contract.

Career

2018
In round 19 of the 2018 season, Pereira made his NRL debut against the North Queensland, scoring a try in St. George Illawarra's 24–10 win.
Pereira played in both finals matches for St. George Illawarra in the 2018 NRL season which were against the Brisbane Broncos and South Sydney.  St. George Illawarra defeated Brisbane in week one at Suncorp Stadium in a shock 48–18 victory.  The following week, St. George Illawarra were defeated by Souths 13–12 at ANZ Stadium ending their season.

2019
Pereira made a total of 11 appearances in the 2019 NRL season and scored 5 tries as St. George Illawarra endured one of their worst ever seasons finishing in 15th position on the table.

2020
He made a total of 15 appearances in the 2020 NRL season scoring one try as St. George Illawarra finished 13th on the table and missed out on the finals.

2021
In round 7 of the 2021 NRL season, he was sent to the sin bin after hitting Sydney Roosters player James Tedesco in the head with a dangerous high tackle during the club's loss at the Sydney Cricket Ground.
On 27 April, he was suspended for three matches over his dangerous high tackle on James Tedesco.
On 18 June it was revealed that Pereira was in talks to make a mid-season switch to the Newcastle Knights before joining the Brisbane Broncos in 2022.

2022
Pereira played five games for Brisbane in the 2022 NRL season and scored two tries. Brisbane would finish the season in 9th place and miss the finals.

Personal life 
On 28 May 2018, Pereira became engaged to his girlfriend Sarah Orange. They were married in late 2019 and have one child together, a boy born in January 2021.

References

External links
St. George Illawarra Dragons profile

1993 births
New Zealand rugby league players
New Zealand sportspeople of Samoan descent
New Zealand people of English descent
St. George Illawarra Dragons players
Brisbane Broncos players
Mackay Cutters players
Rugby league wingers
Living people